The following is a list of presidents of San Luis Potosí municipality, Mexico.

List of officials

 Salvador Nava Martínez y Leonardo V. Hooper, 1959-1961 
 Javier Silva Staines, 1962-1964 
 Manuel Hernández Muro, 1965-1967 
 Guillermo Fonseca Álvarez y  Gabriel Echenique Portillo, 1968-1970 
 , 1971-1973 
 Félix Dahuajare Torres, 1974-1976 
 J. Antonio Ledezma Zavala, 1977-1979 
 Miguel Valladares García, 1980-1982 
 Salvador Nava Martínez, 1983-1985 
 , 1986-1988 
 Guillermo Pizzuto Zamanillo, 1989-1991 
 Mario Leal Campos, 1992-1994 
 Luis García Julián, 1994-1997 
 Alejandro Zapata Perogordo, 1997-2000 
 Jesús Marcelo de los Santos, 2000-2003 
 Homero González Reyes, 2000-2003 
 , 2015-2018

See also
 
 San Luis Potosí history
 List of mayors and municipal presidents of San Luis Potosí City

References

San Luis Potosí
History of San Luis Potosí
San Luis Potosí Municipality